Hubert Alfred Wallace (March 3, 1899 – July 3, 1984) was a Canadian sailor who competed in the 1932 Summer Olympics.

Born in Vancouver, he was a crew member of the Canadian boat Santa Maria which won the silver medal in the 8 metre class in 1932. He died in Oak Bay, British Columbia.

External links
profile

1899 births
1984 deaths
Canadian male sailors (sport)
Olympic medalists in sailing
Olympic sailors of Canada
Olympic silver medalists for Canada
Sailors at the 1932 Summer Olympics – 8 Metre
Sportspeople from Vancouver
Medalists at the 1932 Summer Olympics